A Night Out may refer to:

 A Night Out (1915 film), a 1915 film starring Charlie Chaplin and Edna Purviance
 A Night Out, a 1916 film starring May Robson
 A Night Out (1961 film), an Australian television play
 A Night Out (play), a play by Harold Pinter
 A Night Out (musical) (1920); book by Arthur Miller and George Grossmith, Jr., music by Willie Redstone and lyrics by Clifford Grey